James Ratiff (April 9, 1958 – January 4, 2020), sometimes incorrectly named James Ratliff, was an American basketball player. A  power forward from Washington, D.C., he was known for his high school and collegiate careers.

While in prep school in Washington, D.C., Ratiff was named a McDonald's All-American in 1977 while attending Eastern High School. He was one of the most highly touted recruits in the nation. As a senior, Ratiff averaged 25 points, 17 rebounds, 6 assists, and 5 blocks per game. For a time, Virginia Tech thought they were going to sign him as a recruit. Ratiff ended up choosing Tennessee instead. In 1977–78, he spent his freshman season playing for the Volunteers and averaged 5.4 points and four rebounds per game. He decided to transfer after one year, citing an undesirable social climate in Knoxville as well as unrealistic expectations by the media for trying to make him out to be the next Bernard King, a former Tennessee great.

After sitting out one season due to transfer eligibility rules, Ratiff spent his final three collegiate years at his home city's Howard University. He garnered much success there: in all three seasons he was named an All-MEAC First Team selection, was a three-time All-MEAC tournament First Team pick, and in his sophomore and junior years was named the MEAC Player of the Year.

After his collegiate career ended, Ratiff was selected in the 1982 NBA draft by the Atlanta Hawks (8th round, 172nd pick overall). He never played in the NBA, however.

Ratiff died on January 4, 2020, at age 61.

References

1958 births
2020 deaths
American men's basketball players
Atlanta Hawks draft picks
Basketball players from Washington, D.C.
Howard Bison men's basketball players
McDonald's High School All-Americans
Power forwards (basketball)
Tennessee Volunteers basketball players
Eastern High School (Washington, D.C.) alumni